The Martyr is a compilation album by rapper Immortal Technique, released on October 27, 2011 through free digital download on ViperRecords.com. It is a collection of previously unreleased songs. The Martyr had 200,000 downloads on its first day, and 1,000,000 in its first week through his independent label, Viper Records.

Track listing 

Notes
"Angels & Demons" samples "Dream On" by Aerosmith
"Rich Man's World (1%) starts with an extract of the 1976 movie, Network and samples "Money, Money, Money" by ABBA and "Money" by Pink Floyd
"Goonies Never Die" samples "Theme From the Goonies" by Dave Grusin from the soundtrack to the 1985 movie, The Goonies
"Toast to the Dead" samples "Alpha" by Vangelis
"Eyes in the Sky" samples "Eye in the Sky" by The Alan Parsons Project
"The Martyr" starts with an extract of the 1998 movie, Elizabeth and features an interpolation of "Eleanor Rigby" by The Beatles
"Young Lords" samples "Runaway" by Bon Jovi
"Black Vikings" samples "Beowulf Main Theme" by Alan Silvestri
"Conquerors" samples "Looking Back" by Pierre Arvay
"Sign of the Times" samples "La Partida" by Victor Jara

References

2011 albums
Immortal Technique albums
Albums produced by DJ Green Lantern